For Losers is an album by Archie Shepp released on Impulse! in 1970. The album contains tracks recorded from September 1968 to August 1969 by Shepp with three different ensembles. The AllMusic review by Rob Ferrier states "for anyone wishing to understand the music and career of this brilliant musician, this is an undervalued piece of the puzzle".

Track listing
All compositions by Archie Shepp, except as indicated.
 "Stick 'Em Up" - 2:04
 "Abstract" - 4:21
 "I Got It Bad (And That Ain't Good)" (Duke Ellington, Paul Francis Webster) - 5:15
 "What Would It Be Without You" (Cal Massey) - 4:05
 "Un Croque Monsieur" - 21:49

Recorded September 9, 1968 (track 1), February 17, 1969 (track 2) and August 26, 1969 (tracks 3-5).

Personnel
Track 1
Archie Shepp - tenor saxophone, soprano saxophone
Leon Thomas - lead vocals
Martin Banks - trumpet, flugelhorn
Robin Kenyatta - alto saxophone, flute
Andrew Bey - piano
Bert Payne - guitar
Albert Winston - electric bass, bass
Tasha Thomas, Doris Troy - backing vocals
Beaver Harris - drums

Track 2
Archie Shepp - tenor saxophone
Jimmy Owens - trumpet
Grachan Moncur III - trombone
James Spaulding- alto saxophone
Charles Davis - baritone saxophone
Dave Burrell - organ
Wally Richardson - guitar
Bob Bushnell - electric bass
Bernard Purdie - drums

Tracks 3-5
Archie Shepp - tenor saxophone
Woody Shaw - trumpet
Matthew Gee - trombone
Cedar Walton - piano
Wilbur Ware - bass
Joe Chambers - drums
Clarence Sharpe - alto saxophone (3 and 5)
China-Lin Sharpe - vocals (3 and 5)
Cecil Payne - baritone saxophone, flute (4-5)

References

1970 albums
Archie Shepp albums
Impulse! Records albums
Albums produced by Bob Thiele